Governor Montagu or Montague may refer to:

John Montagu (Royal Navy officer) (1719–1795), Commodore Governor of Newfoundland from 1776 to 1778
Lord Charles Montagu (1741–1784), Royal Governor of the Province of South Carolina from 1766 to 1773
Edmund Montague, Acting Governor of Fort St George in 1709